Viktoriya Fedorivna Hiryn (born 24 October 2000), also known as Vika Hiryn, is a Ukrainian footballer who plays as a midfielder for the Spanish Primera Federación club Deportivo La Coruña and the Ukraine women's national team.

Club career
Hiryn has played for Ladomyr in Ukraine.

International career
Hiryn capped for Ukraine at senior level during the UEFA Women's Euro 2022 qualifying.

References

External links
Viktoriya Hiryn at BDFútbol

2000 births
Living people
People from Novoukrainka
Sportspeople from Kirovohrad Oblast
Ukrainian women's footballers
Women's association football midfielders
Deportivo de La Coruña (women) players
Segunda Federación (women) players
Ukraine women's international footballers
Ukrainian expatriate women's footballers
Ukrainian expatriate sportspeople in Spain
Expatriate women's footballers in Spain